Radio Enciclopedia is a soft music radio network of transmitters broadcast throughout Cuba on medium wave (AM) and VHF (FM). The main frequencies in Havana are 94.1 (FM) and 1260 (AM). It can also be heard for several hundred miles beyond Cuba's borders on 530 (AM) and worldwide via the Internet. It broadcasts soft instrumental music with occasional news and cultural programming. It is one of four main radio stations in Cuba and first broadcast on November 7, 1962.

References

External links
 radioenciclopedia.cu - Official site
 Live stream

Radio networks
Radio stations in Cuba
Radio stations established in 1962
1962 establishments in Cuba